Myxopappus is a genus of South African flowering plants in the chamomile tribe within the daisy family.

 Species
 Myxopappus acutilobus (DC.) Källersjö - South Africa
 Myxopappus hereroensis (O.Hoffm.) Källersjö  - South Africa

References

Anthemideae
Asteraceae genera
Endemic flora of South Africa